Abud or Hayl is a village in Al Buraimi Governorate, in northeastern Oman.The village lies south of Ash Shuwayhah. Nearby is a small populated place called Al Juwayf.

References

Populated places in Oman